Family Devotions is a 1981 play by American playwright David Henry Hwang. Hwang's third play, it depicts the clash of West and East within three generations of an assimilated Chinese-American family living in a Los Angeles suburb. The play premiered on October 18, 1981 Off-Broadway at the Joseph Papp Public Theater. It was directed by Robert Allan Ackerman, with Michael Paul Chan, Jodi Long, Lauren Tom, and Victor Wong. The play was nominated for a Drama Desk Award.

It is published as part of Trying to Find Chinatown: The Selected Plays by Theatre Communications Group. and also in an acting edition published by Dramatists Play Service.

References

Plays by David Henry Hwang
1981 plays